Mark Bredell (born 12 September 1972) is a South African cricketer. He played in seven first-class matches for Boland in 1994/95.

See also
 List of Boland representative cricketers

References

External links
 

1972 births
Living people
South African cricketers
Boland cricketers
Cricketers from Port Elizabeth